Treswithian is a hamlet west of Camborne, Cornwall, England, United Kingdom.

See also

Treswithian Downs

References

Hamlets in Cornwall
Camborne